Joseph Costello (born 13 July 1945) is an Irish Labour Party politician who has been a member of Dublin City Council since 2019. He served as a Minister of State from 2011 to 2014. He was a Teachta Dála (TD) for the Dublin Central constituency from 1992 to 1997 and 2002 to 2016. He was a Senator for the Administrative Panel from 1989 to 1992 and from 1997 to 2002. During his time as councilor, he was Deputy Lord Mayor of Dublin to then Lord Mayor Alison Gilliland from 2021 to 2022.

Early life
Costello was born in Geevagh, County Sligo and was educated at Summerhill College, Sligo, St Patrick's College, Maynooth and University College Dublin. He worked as a secondary school teacher before becoming a full-time public representative.

Career
He was a member of Dublin City Council from 1999 until the end of the dual mandate led to him passing the seat to his wife Emer Costello. He was re-elected to the Council in 2019.

He joined the Labour Party in 1985, and in 1989 he was elected to the 19th Seanad Éireann as a Senator for the Administrative Panel. He remained there until the 1992 general election when he was elected to Dáil Éireann. Costello lost his seat at the 1997 general election but was subsequently elected to the Seanad again. Costello was re-elected to the Dáil at the 2002 and 2007 general elections.

He was director of elections for Michael D. Higgins during the 2011 presidential election.

On 20 December 2011, he was appointed by the Fine Gael–Labour government as Minister of State at the Department of Foreign Affairs and Trade with responsibility for Trade and Development, a position he served in until 15 July 2014. He was dropped as a Minister of State in a reshuffle in July 2014. He was then appointed to the Dáil Public Accounts Committee.

He lost his seat at the 2016 general election. Costello made national headlines in 2017 when he said a snap election could breach the Irish Constitution, as constituencies needed to be revised to take account of changes in population in the 2016 Census.

He was an unsuccessful candidate for the Dublin Central constituency at the 2020 general election.

Personal life
His wife Emer Costello is a former MEP for Dublin.

References

External links
Joe Costello's page on the Labour Party website

 

1945 births
Living people
Alumni of St Patrick's College, Maynooth
Alumni of University College Dublin
Irish schoolteachers
Labour Party (Ireland) TDs
Local councillors in Dublin (city)
Members of the 19th Seanad
Members of the 27th Dáil
Members of the 21st Seanad
Members of the 29th Dáil
Members of the 30th Dáil
Members of the 31st Dáil
Ministers of State of the 31st Dáil
People educated at Summerhill College
Politicians from County Sligo
Labour Party (Ireland) senators